, formerly known as , is a square in the historic centre of Salzburg in Austria. In the centre of the square is a statue in memory of the composer Wolfgang Amadeus Mozart, who was born in the city and after whom the square is now named.

The square was created by Prince-Archbishop Wolf Dietrich von Raitenau who ordered the demolition of a number of houses on this site in the early 17th century. Originally the centre-piece of the square was a baroque fountain with a statue of St. Michael, but this was removed in 1841 to make way for the statue of Mozart.

On the north side of the square, the low  houses the city's tourist information office. On the east side of the square, three houses have a uniform facade and date from the 17th century. Of thse, number 8 was the home of Constanze Mozart-Nissen, Mozart's widow. On the west side are the Salzburg Christmas Museum and the Café Glockenspiel, and in the south-west corner the Mozartplatz opens into the adjacent Residenzplatz.

Mozart Memorial

The statue was to be unveiled in 1841 on the 50th anniversary of Mozart's death. However, this was delayed because a Roman mosaic had been found on the site selected for the statue. After the mosaic had been excavated, the statue was eventually unveiled on 4 September 1842. The marble pedestal on which the statue sits was donated by King Ludwig I of Bavaria. 

A copy of the Roman mosaic can still be found at the foot of the statue, and bears an inscription: "", meaning "Here lives (the luck or happiness), nothing evil might enter".

References

Streets in Salzburg
Tourist attractions in Salzburg